Baie aux Huîtres is a coastal village located on the Mauritian island of Rodrigues in the Indian Ocean.

It has approximately 2,500 inhabitants.

Populated places in Rodrigues